The Karkonosze National Park is a National Park in the Karkonosze Mountains in the Sudetes in southwestern Poland, along the border with the Czech Republic.

The park is located in Lower Silesian Voivodeship, in the highest part of the Sudetes. It was created in 1959 to cover an area of 55.10 km2. The majority of the park area, around 33.80 km2, consists of forests. In 1992 Karkonosze National Park, together with the neighbouring Czech Krkonoše National Park, became part of the Krkonose / Karkonosze biosphere reserve under UNESCO’s Man and the Biosphere (MaB) programme. Also, 40 hectares of peat bogs were designated a Ramsar international wetland site.

Geography
The Karkonosze Mountains are the highest range of the much broader Sudetes mountains stretching horizontally from south-western Poland along the northern border of the Czech Republic to eastern Germany. They are connected by a red hiking trail only for qualified tourists. The characteristic features of its landscape are the glacial kettles with boulders and ponds hidden inside. Weathered granite rocks shaped like mushrooms or maces can also be found on the mountainsides.

The Krkonose/Karkonosze Mountains are situated on the division of the European water system between the basins of two major rivers – the Elbe and the Oder – which means that it also separates the basins of the Baltic Sea and North Sea. Many of the Karkonosze's streams come down the hills, creating waterfalls, the largest of which in the Polish part of the mountains (300 m) is created by the Łomniczka stream.

There are about 100 various birds living in the park, the most numerous of animal species living there. In the higher parts of the mountains there are fewer species of them; in the lower levels there are 100 varieties, but in the peaks there are not more than 10. The park has four species of fish, six species of amphibians, and five species of reptiles. The park's attraction are mouflons, brought here at the beginning of the 20th century.

Karkonosze National Park is visited by more than 1.5 million tourists yearly. They can use 112 kilometres of walking paths, 10 ski lifts and 12 guest houses. The park has its headquarters in the town of Jelenia Góra.

See also
 National Parks of Poland

Gallery

References

External links 

 Karkonoski National Park official website
 The Board of Polish National Parks
 Opera Corcontica - Scientific Journal from the Krkonoše National Park

National parks of Poland
Biosphere reserves of Poland
Ramsar sites in Poland
Protected areas established in 1959
Sudetes
Parks in Lower Silesian Voivodeship
Jelenia Góra
1959 establishments in Poland
Karkonosze County